Tyler Johnson may refer to:

Tyler Johnson (baseball, born 1981), American baseball pitcher
Tyler Johnson (baseball, born 1995), American baseball pitcher
Tyler Johnson (basketball) (born 1992), American basketball player
Tyler Johnson (ice hockey) (born 1990), American ice hockey player
Tyler Johnson (musician) (active from 2012), American record producer and songwriter
Tyler Johnson (American football) (born 1998), American football wide receiver

See also 
 Ty Johnson (disambiguation), various people named Ty or Tyrone Johnson